Phenylacetyl-CoA (C29H42N7O17P3S) is a form of acetyl-CoA formed from the condensation of the thiol group from coenzyme A with the carboxyl group of phenylacetic acid.

Its molecular-weight is 885.7 g/mol. and IUPAC name is  S-[2-[3-[[(2R)-4-[[[(2R,3S,4R,5R)-5-(6-aminopurin-9-yl)-4-hydroxy-3-phosphonooxyoxolan-2-yl]methoxy-hydroxyphosphoryl]oxy-hydroxyphosphoryl]oxy-2-hydroxy-3,3-dimethylbutanoyl]amino]propanoylamino]ethyl] 2-phenylethanethioate. It is formed via the actions of Phenylacetate—CoA ligase.

Phenylacetyl-CoA is often produced via the reduction of ATP to AMP and the conversion of phenylacetate and CoA to diphosphate and Phenylacetyl-CoA.

 ATP + phenylacetate + CoA → AMP + diphosphate + phenylacetyl-CoA

This reaction is catalyzed by phenylacetate-CoA ligase. 

Phenylacetyl-CoA combines with water and quinone to produce phenylglyoxylyl-CoA and quinol via a phenylacetyl-CoA dehydrogenase reaction acting as an oxidoreductase.

Phenylacetyl-CoA inhibits choline acetyltransferase acting as a neurotoxin. It competes with acetyl-CoA.

References 

Glycolysis
Cholinergics
Thioesters of coenzyme A